is a passenger railway station located in the city of Amagasaki Hyōgo Prefecture, Japan. It is operated by the private transportation company Hanshin Electric Railway.

Lines

Layout
The station consists of two opposed ground-level side platforms serving two tracks.

Platforms

History 

Imazu Station opened on 12 April 1905 along with the rest of the Hanshin Main Line. It would be renamed to its current name, Kusugawa Station, on 19 December 1929.

The station was the site of a derailment on 13 December 1949 when a runaway train from the Hankyu Line collided with the platform. At that time, Hankyu trains were slightly wider than the Hanshin trains. There was also a spur connecting to the Hankyū Imazu Line west of this location.

On 17 January 1995, all services were suspended due to the Great Hanshin earthquake. Service on the line was fully restored by 26 June 1995.

Station numbering was introduced on 21 December 2013, with Nishinomiya being designated as station number HS-15.

Gallery

Surrounding area
Nishinomiya Imazu Post Office
Nishinomiya Kyoritsu Neurosurgical Hospital
Nishinomiya Municipal Nishinomiya Support School

See also
List of railway stations in Japan

References

External links

 Kusugawa Station website 

Railway stations in Japan opened in 1905
Railway stations in Hyōgo Prefecture
Nishinomiya